Krishna Reddy or Krishnareddy may refer to:

 Bojjala Gopala Krishna Reddy (born 1949), Srikalahasti MLA in 1994, 1999 and 2009
 Krishna Reddy (artist) (1925-2018), Indian printmaker and sculptor
Krishna S. Reddy (1916–), Fiji Indian school teacher and member of the Legislative Council
 S. V. Krishna Reddy (born 1966), Indian film director
 Vishal Krishna Reddy (born 1977), Indian film actor